Hans-Jürgen Troe (born 4 August 1940) is a German physicist from the University of Göttingen. He was awarded the status of Fellow in the American Physical Society, after he was nominated by his Division of Chemical Physics in 2009, for "experimental and theoretical research on the kinetics of unimolecular reactions of neutral and ionic molecules, and especially for the development of the statistical adiabatic channel model and its application to unimolecular processes from low to high pressures." Was awarded the Otto Hahn Prize in 2015.

References 

Fellows of the American Physical Society
American Physical Society
20th-century German physicists
Living people
1940 births
Max Planck Institute directors
Academic staff of the University of Göttingen